Parknook is a rural locality in the Maranoa Region, Queensland, Australia.

Road infrastructure
The Surat Developmental Road (State Route 87) runs along the northern boundary.

References 

Maranoa Region
Localities in Queensland